Decatur is a city in Root  and Washington townships, Adams County, Indiana, United States. It is the county seat (and the largest community) of Adams County. Decatur is home to Adams Memorial Hospital, which was designated as one of the "Top 100" Critical Access Hospitals in the United States. The population of Decatur was 9,913 at the 2020 census.

History
The first non-Native American settlers arrived in what is now Decatur in 1835. They arrived as a result of the end of the Black Hawk War as well as the completion of the Erie Canal. They consisted entirely of settlers from New England. These were "Yankee" settlers, that is to say they were descended from the English Puritans who settled New England in the colonial era. They were primarily members of the Congregational Church though due to the Second Great Awakening many of them had converted to Methodism and some had become Baptists before coming to what is now Decatur. The Congregational Church subsequently has gone through many divisions and some factions are now known as the Church of Christ and Church of God. When the New England settlers arrived in what is now Decatur there was nothing but a dense virgin forest and wild prairie.

Decatur was founded in 1836. It was named for Stephen Decatur, Jr., one of the captains of the original six frigates of the US navy. A post office was established in Decatur in 1837.

After the Civil War, Decatur was known as a Sundown Town, where African Americans were discriminated against and eventually run out of the town completely in 1902. In a New York Times article published on July 14, 1902, the headline read, “Negro Driven Away,” and it recounted the story of the violent mob attacks which drove away African Americans from Decatur during the summer of 1902. The last line from the article explicitly concluded, “The anti-negroites declare that as Decatur is now cleared of Negroes they will keep it so, and the importation of any more will undoubtedly result in serious trouble.” A month before the last Black person was reportedly forced out of Decatur, the Indianapolis Freeman reported that 50 men began driving the Black people out because they “were determined that colored people should not live in the town." Eventually African Americans began slowly settling in town, however, due to the sundown policies that persisted throughout much of the 1900s, the current demographics still indicate a low percentage of Black residents.

Geography
Decatur is located at  (40.829581, -84.929185).

Demographics

2020 census
As of the 2020 Census there were 9,913 people and 4,278 households. The racial makeup of the city was 91.1% White, 7.3% Hispanic or Latino, 
1.2% African American, 0.1% Native American or Alaska Native, and  0.5% from two or more races. 96.1% speak English and 3.4% speak Spanish at home. All residents of Decatur were citizens. The ancestral background of most residents was 33.3% German, 7.1% English, and 6.9% Irish. 

The average age for Decatur residents was 40.5 years. Of the total population, 6.8% were veterans and 15.8% have a visible or non-visible disability. An estimated 4.6% of residents are uninsured. 

Of the 4,278 households, 30.9% had children under the age of 18 living with them, 36.8% were married couples living together, 35% had a female householder with no spouse present, and 27.3% of the residents were never married. The average household size was 2.24. 

The median income for a household in the city was $45,149, and the median income for a family was $58,542. The per capita income for the city was $23,059. Additionally, 13.9% of the population were below the poverty line, a 57.4% difference from the 2020 census. This includes 15.4% of those under age 18 and 5.2% of those age 65 or over. There was a total of 4,572 housing units, with 64.3% being owned by residents and 12.5% being rented.  

Of the total residents of Decatur, 43.9% have a high school or equivalent degree and 12.9 have a bachelor's degree or higher. The latter is 70% lower than the state average. The majority of residents work in manufacturing (37.4%), education, social services and health care (14.2%) and retail (13.6%). 

Only 76.3% of residents had broadband internet access, in contrast to 80.1% of state residents.

Government

The government consists of a mayor and a city council. The mayor is elected in citywide vote. The city council consists of five members. Four are elected from individual districts. One is elected at-large. A clerk-treasurer is also elected in citywide vote.

Education
The local high school in Decatur is Bellmont High School; approximately 700 students attend BHS. Local elementary and middle school students attend Bellmont Elementary School and Bellmont Middle School. St. Joseph Catholic School serves students in grades K-8. Zion Lutheran School, Wyneken Memorial Lutheran School, and St. Peter-Immanuel Lutheran School also serve students in grades PK-8.

Decatur has a public library, a branch of the Adams Public Library System.

Economy
Some of the larger employers in Decatur include Bunge Limited, Rev RV, and Thunderbird Products also known as Formula Boats, Arnold Lumber.
Locally established restaurants and bars in Decatur include 224 Pub & Grill, Back 40 Junction, The Galley, Two Brothers Bar and Restaurant, the West End Restaurant,  Vinnie's Bar, River View Tavern, The Wet Spot, Double Eagle Clubhouse Grille, Famous Monster Pizza, Soul Pig BBQ, and Small Town Bar & Grill
Lingenfelter Performance Engineering, well known for performance tuning and producing after-market parts for GM sports cars especially the Chevrolet Corvette is located in Decatur.

Notable people
David Anspaugh, television and film director, Hoosiers, Rudy
John Fetzer, former owner of Detroit Tigers
Bob Hite, Sr., radio and television announcer for CBS
David Smith, Sculptor

See also
Indiana Register of Historic Sites and Structures
National Register of Historic Places listings in Adams County, Indiana
Peace Monument

References

External links

 
Decatur Daily Democrat
 Decatur Chamber of Commerce

 

Cities in Adams County, Indiana
Cities in Indiana
Micropolitan areas of Indiana
County seats in Indiana
Populated places established in 1836
1836 establishments in Indiana
Sundown towns in Indiana